Hannah Dustin Howell (born 1950 in Massachusetts) is a best-selling American author of over 40 historical romance novels.  Many of her novels are set in medieval Scotland.  She also writes under the names Sarah Dustin, Sandra Dustin, and Anna Jennet.

Biography
Howell is descended from some of the original American colonists, with her maternal ancestors settling in Massachusetts in the 1630s. While on a trip to England, Howell met her husband, aeronautical engineer Stephen, and they have been married for over thirty years. They have two sons, Samuel and Keir, three grandchildren, and five cats.

Howell was a housewife and stay-at-home mother before beginning to write. She published her first novel in 1988 and is an active member of the Romance Writers of America. Howell is a very prolific author, averaging more than one book per year. Howell has twice been awarded the Golden Leaf Award, has been a Romance Writers of America RITA Award Finalist, and has won several awards from the Romantic Times Bookclub Magazine.

Howell enjoys history, reading, crochet, piano, and gardening.

Bibliography

Highland Brides
His Bonnie Bride (Amber Flame) (1988) -Tavis MacLagan e Storm Eldom
Promised Passion (Highland Wedding) (1988)-Sir Iain MacLagan’s e  Islaen MacRoth
Reckless (1993) (writing as Anna Jennet) -Ailis Macfarlane e Alexander MaDubh

Murray Family
Highland Destiny (1998) - Sir Balfour Murray e Maldie Kirkaldy
Highland Honor (1999) - Nigel Murray e Gisele knew
Highland Promise (1999) - Eric Murray e Bethia Drummond’s
Highland Vow (2000) - Elspeth Murray e Cormac Armstrong
Highland Knight (2001) - Cameron MacAlpin e Avery Murray
Highland Bride (2002) - Gillyanne Murray e Sir Connor MacEnroy
Highland Angel (2003) - Sir Payton Murray e  Kirstie MacLye
Hightland Groom (2003) -Sir Diarmot MacEnroy e Ilsa Campbell 
Highland Conqueror (2005) - Sigimor Cameron e Lady Jolene Gerard
Highland Barbarian (2006) - Sir Artan Murray e Cecily Donaldson knows
Highland Lover (2006) - Gregor MacFingal Cameron e Alana Murray’s
Highland Savage (2007) - Sir Lucas Murray e Katerina Haldane
Highland Wolf (2008) - Annora MacKay  e James Drummond
Highland Sinner (2008) - Sir Tormand Murray e Morainn Ross
Highland Captive (2008) - Aimil Mengue e Parlan MacGuin
Highland Fire (2008) - Moira Robertson e Tavig MacAlpin 
Highland Protector (2010) - Sir Simon Innes e Ilsabeth Murray Armstrong
Highland Warrior(2010) - Ewan MacFingal e Fiona MacEnroy
Highland Hero (2011)  - novella 
Highland Champion (2011) - Liam Cameron e Keira Murray MacKail
Highland Avenger (2012) -  Sir Brian MacFingal e Arianna Murray Lucette
Highland Master (2013) -  Sir Brett Murray e Triona McKee’s
Highland Guard (2015) - Sir Harcourt Murray e Annys MacQueen
Highland Chieftain(2016) - Sir Callum MacMillan e Bethoc Matheson
Highland Devil (2018) - Sir Gybbon Murray's  e Mora Ogilvy  - Expected publication: July 31, 2018

Murray/MacEnroys
Highland Groom ( NOV 2003)
Highland Warrior (2004)

Murray/Camerons
Highland Conqueror (2005)
Highland Champion (2011)
Highland Lover (2006)

Wherlocke Series
If He's Wicked (2009)
If He's Sinful (2009)
If He's Wild (2010)
If He's Dangerous (June 2011)
If He's Tempted (2013)
If He's Daring (2014)
If He's Noble (2015)

Vampire Series / The MacNachtons
The Eternal Highlander “Nightriders” (2005) (with Lynsay Sands)
Highland Vampire “Kiss of the Vampire” (2006) (with Adrienne Basso and Debbie Raleigh)
My Immortal Highlander “The Hunt” (2007) (with Lynsay Sands)
Eternal Lover "The Yearning"  (2008)  (with Jackie Kessler and Richelle Mead and Lynsay Sands)
Highland Thirst “Blood Feud” (2008) (with Lynsay Sands)
Nature of the Beast “Dark Hero” (2009) (with Adrienne Basso and Eve Silver)
Highland Beast “The Beast Within” (2010) (with Heather Grothaus and Victoria Dahl)
Yours for Eternity “Highland Blood” (2011) (with Alexandra Ivy and Kaitlin O'Riley)
Highland Hunger "Dark Embrace" (2012) (with Michele Sinclair and Jackie Ivie)
Born to Bite "Dark Secret" (2013) (with Diana Cosby and Erica Ridley)

Stand alone novels
A Taste of Fire (1988) (writing as Sarah Dustin)
Compromised Hearts (1989)
Elfking's Lady (Highland Captive) (1990)
Stolen Ecstasy (1991)
Conqueror's Kiss (1991)
Beauty and the Beast (1992)
Silver Flame (1992)
Wild Conquest (1993)
Kentucky Bride (1994)
Only for You (1995)
Fire (Highland Fire) (1995) (writing as Anna Jennet)
My Lady Captor (1996) (writing as Anna Jennet)
My Valiant Knight (1996)
Unconquered (1996)
Wild Roses (1997)
A Stockingful of Joy (1999)
Highland Hearts (2002)

Anthologies
Baby Dreams (1996) (with Barbara Benedict, Phoebe Conn, Carol Finch, Jo Goodman and Jane Kidder)
A Joyous Season (1996) (with Olga Bicos, Jennifer Blake and Fern Michaels)
Scottish Magic: Four Spellbinding Tales of Magic And Timeless Love (1997) (with Mandalyn Kaye, Elizabeth Ann Michaels and Stobie Piel)
Castle Magic (1999) (with Colleen Faulkner, Judith E French)
Magically Delicious (2002) (with Jo Goodman and Linda Madl)

External links
Hannah Howell Official Website
Interview with Wax Romantic

1950 births
20th-century American novelists
21st-century American novelists
American romantic fiction writers
Living people
American women novelists
Women romantic fiction writers
20th-century American women writers
21st-century American women writers